Harjo is an unincorporated community in Pottawatomie County, Oklahoma, United States. The post office was established June 24, 1921, and discontinued August 31, 1954. The name means "brave beyond discretion" in the Creek (Muscogee) language. Nearby is the Rose-Fast site, a prehistoric Indian base camp dating from the Woodland period, 0-1000 AD. The site was added to the NRHP in 1986.

Unincorporated communities in Pottawatomie County, Oklahoma
Unincorporated communities in Oklahoma